Norman Williams (7 June 1918 - 27 March 2010) was a British actor and film producer born in Holywell, Flintshire. He acted in the 1940s and early 1950s before turning to producing.

Selected Credits
Once a Sinner (1950)
The Errol Flynn Theatre (1956)
White Hunter (1957)
Witness in the Dark (1959) - (starring Williams' wife, Patricia Dainton)
The Shakedown (1960)
Your Money or Your Wife (1960)
And Women Shall Weep (1960)
Piccadilly Third Stop (1960)
It's All Happening (1963)
The Man Who Finally Died (1963)
Five Golden Dragons (1967) - production supervisor
The Million Eyes of Sumuru (1967) - production supervisor

References

External links
Norman Williams at IMDb
Norman Williams at BFI

1918 births
2010 deaths
British film producers